Ashiya may refer to:

 Ashiya, Hyōgo, Japan
 Ashiya University, Hyōgo
 Ashiya, Fukuoka, Japan
 Ashiya, a subcaste of Charans from Rajasthan, India
 Mizuki Ashiya, the lead character in the manga series Hana-Kimi
Ashiya Station (disambiguation)